Geoland Pantophlet (born June 14, 1976 ) is an Aruban football player. He played for the Aruba national team in 1996 and 2004.

National team statistics

References

1976 births
Living people
Aruban footballers
Association football goalkeepers
SV Racing Club Aruba players
Aruba international footballers